Jaime Laredo (born June 7, 1941) is a violinist and conductor.  He was the conductor and Music Director of the Vermont Symphony Orchestra, and he began his musical career when he was five years old.

Laredo was born in Cochabamba, Bolivia. In 1948, he came to North America and took lessons from Antonio de Grassi. He also studied with Frank Houser before moving to Cleveland, Ohio, to study under Josef Gingold in 1953. He studied with Ivan Galamian at the Curtis Institute of Music until his graduation. From 1960 to 1974 he was married to the pianist Ruth Laredo. Laredo is currently a professor at the renowned Cleveland Institute of Music.  He served as artistic advisor for the Fort Wayne Philharmonic Orchestra and guest conducted the orchestra on April 18, 2009, in a program featuring his wife, the cellist Sharon Robinson. He was scheduled to again conduct the orchestra for two programs during the 2009–10 season.  Laredo and Robinson were also featured soloists in a special concert conducted by Andrew Constantine, who became the Philharmonic's music director in July 2009.

His Carnegie Hall recital in October 1960 was much praised, and helped to launch his career. The next year, he played at Royal Albert Hall in London.  Afterwards, he has played with many major European and American orchestras, including the Royal Liverpool Philharmonic Orchestra, Boston Symphony Orchestra, the Chicago Symphony Orchestra, the New York Philharmonic, the Cleveland Orchestra, the Philadelphia Orchestra, the London Symphony Orchestra, the Royal Philharmonic, The Children's Orchestra Society and the Syracuse Symphony Orchestra.

He also plays viola, and has recorded piano quartets with Isaac Stern, Yo-Yo Ma, and Emanuel Ax. In addition, he collaborated with pianist Glenn Gould.  He is the violinist of the Kalichstein-Laredo-Robinson Trio, along with pianist Joseph Kalichstein and cellist Sharon Robinson.  He has been the conductor of the Vermont Symphony Orchestra since 1999.

The Cleveland Institute of Music announced the appointment of Laredo and wife Sharon Robinson to the string faculty in 2012.

Competitions, prizes, and awards 
 Queen Elisabeth of Belgium Competition (1959)
 Deutsche Schallplatten Prize
 Gramophone Award
 Several Emmy Award nominations
Grammy Award for Best Chamber Music Performance:
Emanuel Ax, Jaime Laredo, Yo-Yo Ma & Isaac Stern for Brahms: Piano Quartets (Op. 25 and 26) (1992)

Discography 
 Judith Blegen and Frederica von Stade: Songs, Arias and Duets, with the Chamber Music Society of Lincoln Center, Columbia, 1975

Sources
 Bernas, Richard. 2001. "Laredo, Jaime". The New Grove Dictionary of Music and Musicians, edited by Stanley Sadie and John Tyrrell. New York: Grove's Dictionaries.

1941 births
American classical violinists
Male classical violinists
Bolivian classical violinists
American male violinists
American male conductors (music)
Curtis Institute of Music alumni
Bolivian emigrants to the United States
Jacobs School of Music faculty
Violin pedagogues
Living people
Bolivian classical musicians
Grammy Award winners
Musicians from Indiana
People from Cochabamba
Prize-winners of the Queen Elisabeth Competition
Cleveland Institute of Music faculty
Musicians from Shaker Heights, Ohio
Classical musicians from Ohio
21st-century American conductors (music)
21st-century classical violinists
21st-century American male musicians
21st-century American violinists